The 1963–64 season was Aberdeen's 51st season in the top flight of Scottish football and their 53rd season overall. Aberdeen competed in the Scottish League Division One, Scottish League Cup, Scottish Cup and the Summer Cup.

Results

Division 1

Final standings

Scottish League Cup

Group 2

Group 2 final table

Scottish Cup

1964 Summer Cup

Group 1

Group 1 final table

Knockout stage 

Final took place in August.

References 

 
 AFC Heritage Trust

Aberdeen F.C. seasons
Aber